Copenhagen Central Post Building (Danish: Centralpostbygningen), located on Tietgensgade, just behind the Central Station, in the Vesterbro district of Copenhagen, Denmark, was originally built as a new headquarters for the Danish Post and Telegraph Company and now houses Villa Copenhagen, new luxury hotel planned to open April 2020.

The building was designed in Neo-Baroque style by Heinrich Wenck, who also designed the Central Station, and completed in 1912.

History
 
The Danish Mail Services traces its history back to 1624 and it was based in Mail Building in Købmagergade from 1779. When those premises became too small, in about 1900, it was decided to build a new headquarters next to the new Central Railway Station and not far from the new City Hall which was completed in 1905. Chief architect of the Danish State Railways, Heinrich Wenck, who had also designed the new central station, was charged with the commission and the new central post building was constructed from 1898 to 1812.

Architecture
The Central Post Building is designed in Neo-Baroque style, one among several styles which, as a reaction to the dominance of Historicism in Danish architecture, won popularity in the beginning of the 20th century in Denmark.

See also
 Architecture of Denmark

References

External links
 Renderings in the Danish National Art Library

Heinrich Wenck buildings
Baroque Revival architecture in Copenhagen
Government buildings completed in 1912
Vesterbro, Copenhagen
1912 establishments in Denmark